Yenilik is a village and municipality in the Agsu Rayon of Azerbaijan. It has a population of 1,174.  The municipality consists of the villages of Yenilik, Gursulu, and Elabad.

The original name is Seferbine. Native language of the village is kurush dialect of lezgian.

References

Populated places in Agsu District